The American Irish Historical Society (AIHS) is a historical society devoted to Irish American history that was founded in Boston in the late 19th century. Non-partisan and non-sectarian since its inception in 1897, it maintains the most complete private collection of Irish and Irish-American literature and history in the United States, and it publishes a journal entitled The Recorder. The society also holds various cultural events at its headquarters at 991 Fifth Avenue in New York City.

Locations
Founded in Boston, Massachusetts, in the late 19th century and in continuous operation since 1897, the society has been non-partisan and non-sectarian since its inception. It was founded as a response to the establishment of the Scotch-Irish Society, which was founded in 1889. The society was relocated to New York City in 1904 by T. H. Murray, then serving as the society's Secretary-General. Perhaps the most notable member of the society at the time was President Theodore Roosevelt.

The society's formal purpose is "to place permanently on record the story of the Irish in America from the earliest settlement to the present day, justly, impartially, fully, and sympathetically correcting neglect and misrepresentation by certain historians of the part taken in the founding, upbuilding and safeguarding of the Nation by persons of Irish birth and descent." Notable members through the years have included politician William Bourke Cockran, tenor John McCormack, New York Governor Hugh Carey, and performer/composer George M. Cohan. 

In 1939, the society bought a Beaux-Arts townhouse on Fifth Avenue in New York City, which it still occupies. The society's headquarters is at 991 Fifth Avenue, opposite the Metropolitan Museum of Art.

21st century
As of 2011, members included "prominent doctors, writers, lawyers and even some boldface names like Liam Neeson." It continued to hold a "vast collection of rare books" and hold various cultural events such as poetry readings and concerts. In early 2011, New York Mayor Michael Bloomberg apologized publicly after joking at a dinner that he's seen a bunch of people "totally inebriated” hanging from the society's balcony on St. Patrick's Day. The comment spurred complaints about Irish stereotyping. The New York Times published an article stating Bloomberg "could hardly have picked a more unlikely [stereotyping] target," with locals feeling "surprise and puzzlement that the carefully preserved building and its staid crowd had been singled out as an emblem for, of all things, rowdiness."

Kevin M. Cahill is president-general emeritus of the American-Irish Historical Society.  With around 10,000 volumes, it "maintains the most complete private collection of Irish-American and Irish literature and history in the United States." The society publishes a journal entitled The Recorder and hosts cultural and historical events.

During the holiday seasons of 2016 and 2017, AIHS was home to the Irish Repertory Theatre's production of The Dead, 1904. The show was an adaptation of James Joyce's "The Dead", adapted by novelist Jean Hanff Korelitz and her husband, Irish poet Paul Muldoon. For The Dead, 1904, the building had 57 guests at a time, who for part of the performance joined the cast for a holiday feast drawn from the original novella. The Dead, 1904, continued to run until 2018.

In January 2021, the headquarters was placed on sale for $52 million "to best enable the Society to pursue its cultural and scholarly mission in a sustainable manner." However, The New York Times subsequently reported that AIHS had encountered organizational and financial difficulties in the preceding years, exacerbated by restrictions related to the COVID-19 pandemic during 2020. Among those who objected to the proposed sale was Simon Coveney, the Foreign Affairs and Defence minister for Ireland's parliament.

AIHS Gold Medal
The American Irish Historical Society annually awards the AIHS Gold Medal to an Irish-American or Irish national of significant accomplishment. Past honorees have included Bono, George J. Mitchell, Mary Higgins Clark, Wilbur Ross, Michael J. Dowling, and Robert McCann.

References

External links

 Official website

 Historical societies of the United States
 Irish-American history
 Irish-American culture in Boston
 Historical societies in New York City
 Organizations established in 1897
 Irish-American culture in New York City